Cenk Telkıvıran Orchestra was founded by Cenk Telkıvıran.

Telkıvıran, who has made a name for himself with his works in the music industry since 1987, has his signature on many albums and songs by establishing an orchestra.

He has album works with names such as Niran Ünsal, Berkay, Göksel, Altay, Yıldız Tilbe.

In addition to orchestral artists, he has also signed many albums.

Discography 
Dillere Destan - 1995 (with Yıldız Tilbe)

Küçücüğüm - 1995 (with Yıldız Tilbe)

Buz Kırağı - 2018 (with Yıldız Tilbe and Edis)

Various - 2018 (with Yıldız Tilbe)

Karaerler - 2018 (with Edis)

Milat Saydım - 2021

Niyetini Boz Da Gel - 2022

Delisin Leyla - 2022

References 

Orchestras